Robert Andrew Howie (4 June 1923 – 10 March 2012) was a notable English petrologist.

Life 
He joined the RAF University Six Months course in 1941. He was hoping to go to Cambridge (engineering), but he was assigned to Edinburgh (meteorology). He contracted polio while in Gibraltar, ending his RAF duty.

He went to Trinity College, Cambridge (Chemistry, Geology and Mineralogy) after the RAF, graduating in 1950. His doctorate was about charnockites (very dark granites) from India. He was Lecturer at Manchester University after 1953, and Reader and later Professor at King's College London after 1962. He was appointed Lyell Professor of Geology at Royal Holloway, University of London in 1986. W A Deer, R A Howie and J Zussman authored the series 'Rock-Forming Minerals', a widely known mineralogy textbook (1 ed. had 5 vol., 2 ed. has finally all 11 vol.). He was principal editor of Mineralogical Abstracts (1971–2003), he would write over 1600 abstracts per year (during c. 35 years).

The mineral howieite (IMA 1964-017) was named in his honour. Cambridge University awarded him a ScD degree (1974), 'The Geological Society' awarded him the Murchison Medal (1976) and the Mineralogical Society of America awarded him the Public Service Award (1999).

Selected publications 
Deer, William Alexander; Howie, Robert Andrew; Zussman, Jack (1962–1963) Rock-Forming Minerals (1 ed.). London: Longman. Note: 5 volumes.

Rock-Forming Minerals series, 2 ed.

References 

20th-century British geologists
2012 deaths
1923 births
Petrologists
Royal Air Force officers
Royal Air Force personnel of World War II